The 2014 Dubai Tour was the first running of the Dubai Tour, organised by RCS Sport and the Dubai Sports Council. It was rated a 2.1 event in the UCI Asia Tour and took place between 5 February and 8 February 2014.

The race consisted of four stages: an individual time trial followed by three stages suited for sprinters. Taylor Phinney won the time trial and the overall title; Marcel Kittel won the other three stages and the points jersey.

Teams

16 teams participated in the race including 11 UCI Pro Tour teams.

United Arab Emirates National Cycling Team

Stages

General classification 

The overall title was won by Taylor Phinney, following his time-trial victory in the first stage.

Classification leadership table

References

External links 

 

2014
Dubai Tour
2014 in Emirati sport